Suttie is a surname of Scottish origin. It came from either Suddie in Black Isle or Suthie in Perthshire. The surname was derived from the Old English 'suth' meaning 'south', or the Old Norse 'suthr', southern, plus the Scandinavian 'ey', an island, or piece of firm land in a fen.

Notable people
Heather Suttie
Jason Suttie
Grant-Suttie baronets
Isy Suttie

References

Surnames
Surnames of Scottish origin